Ken Flach and Robert Seguso won the final 3–6, 6–3, 6–3 against Sammy Giammalva Jr. and David Pate.

Seeds

  Ken Flach /  Robert Seguso (champions)
  Paul Annacone /  Christo van Rensburg (semifinals)
  John Alexander /  John Fitzgerald (quarterfinals)
  Peter Doohan /  Michael Fancutt (first round)

Draw

External links
1985 Paine Webber Classic Doubles Draw

Doubles